The Iron Way is a ridgeway in the Ore Mountains in central Europe whose historic route follows the Ore Mountain Northern Escarpment (Erzgebirgische Nordrandstufe).

According to local historic accounts, it is said to have been used in the Middle Ages for the transport of iron ore from the area around the Schneeberg.

The way, which is still signed today, starts at Katzenstein near Affalter and passes through the Streitwald to Tabakstanne, continuing through the municipal forest, past the monument of the Black Cross (Schwarzes Kreuz) to the hill of Harthauer Berg on the B 95 federal highway, south of Chemnitz.

Today, the Iron Way is a popular route for walkers and cyclists, linking the area south of Chemnitz with the trails of the central Ore Mountain region.

Literature 
 
 

Hiking trails in Germany
Mining in the Ore Mountains
Sport in Saxony